Andreas Dreizler (born 27 March 1966 in Freiburg im Breisgau, Germany) is a German physicist, professor of mechanical engineering at the Technische Universität Darmstadt and heads the division of reactive flows and measurement technology.

In 2014, he received the Gottfried Wilhelm Leibniz Prize, the highest award for researchers in Germany, for his achievements in quantitative laser diagnostics of reactive flows. His scientific achievements include, for example the world's first measurements of carbon water concentrations and temperatures in flames using nonlinear optics.

Life 
Andreas Dreizler studied physics at the University of Kiel, where he received his intermediate diplom in 1988. He continued his studies at the Ruprecht-Karls-University Heidelberg and received his diplom in 2002. During this time, he had research stays at the University of Oxford supported by a DAAD scholarship. In 2005 he received his doctorate in physical chemistry under Jürgen Wolfrum with a thesis on polarization spectroscopy. The title of his dissertation was "Einsatz von Vierwellenmischug und Polarisationsspektroskopie zur Diagnostik reaktiver Strömungen" (Use of four-wave mixing and polarization spectroscopy for the diagnosis of reactive flows). He then worked as a technology consultant for laser technology at the Association of German Engineers in Düsseldorf and as a university assistant and working group leader at the Institute for Technical Combustion at the University of Stuttgart. In 2002 he completed his habilitation in combustion technology with Johannes Janicka at the Technische Universität Darmstadt. The title of his habilitation thesis was "Über Experimente zur Entwicklung und Validierung von Modelle für die Beschreibung turbulenter Flammen" (On Experiments for the Development and Validation of Models for the Description of Turbulent Flames).

He is married and has four children. He is a member of the German Bunsen Society for Physical Chemistry, the Optical Society and the German Section of the Combustion Institute.

Publications

References 

1966 births
Academic staff of Technische Universität Darmstadt
21st-century German physicists
20th-century German physicists
Living people
Technische Universität Darmstadt alumni
German mechanical engineers
Engineers from Freiburg im Breisgau